VA-12 has the following meanings:
Attack Squadron 12 (U.S. Navy)
Virginia State Route 12 (disambiguation)

VA-12 (Valladolid), a highway in Spain